The Pettalidae are a family of harvestmen with 75 described species in 10 genera. Several undescribed species are known or assumed in some genera.

Name
Pettalus is a name from Greek mythology that appears in Ovid's Metamorphoses.

Description
All species except the cave-dwelling South African Speleosiro argasiformis spend their entire life cycle in leaf litter.

They are two to five millimeters long, usually with an oval shaped body.

Although all Pettalidae except Parapurcellia have eyes, these were long thought to be absent in the family, mainly because they cannot be seen by scanning electron microscopy. They are often incorporated at the base of the ozophores and typically lack lenses.

Distribution
The members of this family are distributed throughout former temperate Gondwana, with genera in Chile, South Africa, Madagascar, Sri Lanka, eastern and western Australia, and New Zealand, where they are most diverse by far, with 29 species and subspecies found in three genera.

Relationships

The family Pettalidae is monophyletic, although it is at the moment (2007) unclear what the nearest relatives are. It probably originated in the southern part of Gondwana. Parsimony analysis suggests it could be a sister group to the remaining Cyphophthalmi, though this could also be the case for the Stylocellidae, or it could be related to the Sironidae, or specifically to the sironid genus Suzukielus. It is unrelated to the Troglosironidae that are endemic to New Caledonia.

The main lineages of the family may have arisen rapidly, possibly during the rapid expansion of Glossopteris forests that were predominant in temperate Gondwana. Pettalidae were likely present throughout the forests of Antarctica, which formed a land bridge between Australia and South America up until circa 50 million years ago (mya).

The Australian genera Austropurcellia (Eastern Australia: Queensland) and Karripurcellia (Western Australia) are not sister groups. It is possible that the Cyphophthalmi dispersed across Australia while the central region was covered with Nothofagus rainforest (until 37 mya), or that the ancestors of the two genera independently dispersed from adjacent landmasses now separate from Australia.

Parapurcellia from eastern South Africa is sister to all other Pettalidae, while Purcellia from western South Africa is sister to the Chilean Chileogovea. Western South Africa and southern South America were last connected during the Late Jurassic, about 150 mya. Likewise, the monotypic Neopurcellia from New Zealand appears as the sister group to all Pettalidae except for Parapurcellia, instead of being monophyletic with the other two New Zealand genera, which themselves appear as sister groups in Bayesian analysis, but not in direct optimization parsimony analyses.

Species

The family Pettalidae contains the following genera and species:

 Aoraki Boyer & Giribet, 2007 (New Zealand)

 Aoraki calcarobtusa Forster, 1952 
 Aoraki calcarobtusa calcarobtusa Forster, 1952 
 Aoraki calcarobtusa westlandica Forster, 1952
 Aoraki crypta Forster, 1948
 Aoraki denticulata Forster, 1948 
 Aoraki denticulata denticulata Forster, 1948
 Aoraki denticulata major Forster, 1952
 Aoraki granulosa Forster, 1952
 Aoraki healyi Forster, 1948
 Aoraki inerma Forster, 1948
 Aoraki inerma inerma Forster, 1948
 Aoraki inerma stephenensis Forster, 1952
 Aoraki longitarsa Forster, 1952
 Aoraki tumidata Forster, 1948

 Austropurcellia Shear, 1980 (Australia: Queensland)

 Austropurcellia absens Boyer & Popkin-Hall, 2015
 Austropurcellia acuta Popkin-Hall & Boyer, 2014
 Austropurcellia alata Boyer & Reuter, 2012
 Austropurcellia arcticosa Cantrell, 1980
 Austropurcellia barbata Popkin-Hall & Boyer, 2014
 Austropurcellia cadens Baker & Boyer, 2015
 Austropurcellia capricornia Todd Davies, 1977
 Austropurcellia clousi Boyer, Baker & Popkin-Hall, 2015
 Austropurcellia culminis Boyer & Reuter, 2012
 Austropurcellia daviesae Juberthie, 1989
 Austropurcellia despectata Boyer & Reuter, 2012
 Austropurcellia finniganensis Popkin-Hall, Jay & Boyer, 2016
 Austropurcellia forsteri Juberthie, 2000
 Austropurcellia fragosa  Popkin-Hall, Jay & Boyer, 2016
 Austropurcellia giribeti Boyer & Quay, 2015
 Austropurcellia megatanka Jay, Coblens & Boyer, 2016
 Austropurcellia monteithi Jay, Popkin-Hall, Coblens & Boyer, 2016
 Austropurcellia nuda Popkin-Hall, Jay & Boyer, 2016
 Austropurcellia riedeli Jay, Coblens & Boyer, 2016
 Austropurcellia scoparia Juberthie, 1988
 Austropurcellia sharmai Boyer & Quay, 2015
 Austropurcellia superbensis Popkin-Hall & Boyer, 2014
 Austropurcellia tholei Baker & Boyer, 2015
 Austropurcellia vicina Boyer & Reuter, 2012
 Austropurcellia woodwardi Forster, 1955

 Chileogovea Roewer, 1961 (Chile)

 Chileogovea jocasta Shear, 1993
 Chileogovea oedipus Roewer, 1961

 Karripurcellia Giribet, 2003 (Australia: Western Australia)
 Karripurcellia harveyi Giribet, 2003
 Karripurcellia peckorum Giribet, 2003
 Karripurcellia sierwaldae Giribet, 2003

 Manangotria Shear & Gruber, 1996 (Madagascar)

 Manangotria taolanaro Shear & Gruber, 1996

 Neopurcellia Forster, 1948 (New Zealand: South Island)
 Neopurcellia salmoni Forster, 1948

 Parapurcellia Rosas Costa, 1950 (eastern South Africa)

 Parapurcellia amatola de Bivort & Giribet, 2010
 Parapurcellia convexa de Bivort & Giribet, 2010
 Parapurcellia fissa Lawrence, 1939
 Parapurcellia minutade Bivort & Giribet, 2010
 Parapurcellia monticola Lawrence, 1939
 Parapurcellia natalia de Bivort & Giribet, 2010
 Parapurcellia peregrinator Lawrence, 1963
 Parapurcellia rumpiana Lawrence, 1933
 Parapurcellia silvicola Lawrence, 1939
 Parapurcellia staregai de Bivort & Giribet, 2010

 Pettalus Thorell, 1876 (Sri Lanka)

 Pettalus brevicauda Pocock, 1897
 Pettalus cimiciformis O. P-Cambridge, 1875
 Pettalus lampetides Sharma & Giribet, 2006
 Pettalus thwaitesi Sharma, Karunarathna & Giribet, 2009

 Purcellia Hansen & Sørensen, 1904  (western South Africa)

 Purcellia argasiformis Lawrence, 1931
 Purcellia griswoldi de Bivort & Giribet, 2010
 Purcellia illustrans Hansen & Sørensen, 1904
 Purcellia lawrencei de Bivort & Giribet, 2010
 Purcellia leleupi Starega, 2008
 Purcellia transvaalica Lawrence, 1963

 Rakaia Hirst, 1925 (New Zealand)

 Rakaia antipodiana Hirst, 1925
 Rakaia dorothea Phillipps & Grimmett, 1932
 Rakaia florensis Forster, 1948
 Rakaia isolata Forster, 1952
 Rakaia lindsayi Forster, 1952
 Rakaia macra Boyer & Giribet, 2003
 Rakaia magna Forster, 1948
 Rakaia magna australis Forster, 1952
 Rakaia magna magna Forster, 1948
 Rakaia media Forster, 1948 
 Rakaia media insula Forster, 1952
 Rakaia media media Forster, 1948
 Rakaia minutissima Forster, 1948
 Rakaia pauli Forster, 1952
 Rakaia solitaria Forster, 1948
 Rakaia sorenseni Forster, 1952 
 Rakaia sorenseni digitata Forster, 1952
 Rakaia sorenseni sorenseni Forster, 1952
 Rakaia stewartiensis Forster, 1948
 Rakaia uniloca Forster, 1952

See also
 Environment of Sri Lanka

Footnotes

References
 Joel Hallan's Biology Catalog: Pettalidae
 Checklist of the Cyphophthalmi species of the World (with pictures)
  (1971): Les opilions cyphophthalmes cavernicoles. Notes sur Speleosiro argasiformis Lawrence. Bull. Mus. Natl Hist. Nat. 42: 864–871.
  (eds.) (2007): Harvestmen - The Biology of Opiliones. Harvard University Press 
  (2007):  A new model Gondwanan taxon: systematics and biogeography of the harvestman family Pettalidae (Arachnida, Opiliones, Cyphophthalmi), with a taxonomic revision of genera from Australia and New Zealand. Cladistics 23(4): 337-361. 

Harvestmen
Harvestman families